Pseudopostega plicatella is a moth of the family Opostegidae. It was described by Donald R. Davis and Jonas R. Stonis, 2007. It is known from Pará in north-eastern Brazil and east-central Ecuador.

The length of the forewings is 2.5–3.2 mm. Adults have been recorded in January.

Etymology
The species name is derived from the Latin plico (meaning fold) added to the diminutive suffix ella (meaning little) in reference to the small, median fold at the anterior margin of the male gnathos.

References

Opostegidae
Moths described in 2007